
Sztum County is a unit of territorial administration and local government (powiat) in Pomeranian Voivodeship, northern Poland.

The county was created, as a result of local pressure, in 2002. The area had been part of Malbork County.

As of 2019 its total population is 41,476, out of which the population of Sztum is 9,940, that of Dzierzgoń is 5,364, and the rural population is 26,172.

Sztum County on a map of the counties of Pomeranian Voivodeship

Sztum County is bordered by Malbork County to the north, Elbląg County to the north-east, Ostróda County to the east, Iława County to the south-east, Kwidzyn County to the south and Tczew County to the west.

Administrative division
The county is subdivided into five gminas (two urban-rural and three rural). These are listed in the following table, in descending order of population.

See also
 LGBT ideology-free zone

References

 
Sztum